The 2007 Sultan Azlan Shah Cup was the 16th edition of field hockey tournament the Sultan Azlan Shah Cup.

Participating nations
Eight countries participated in the tournament:

Fixtures and results
All times are Malaysia Standard Time (UTC+08:00)

Preliminary round

Pool A

Pool B

Classification round

Fifth to eighth place classification

Crossover

Seventh and eighth place

Fifth and sixth place

First to fourth place classification

Semi-finals

Third and Fourth place

Final

Final ranking
This ranking does not reflect the actual performance of the team as the ranking issued by the International Hockey Federation. This is just a benchmark ranking in the Sultan Azlan Shah Cup only.

References

External links
Official website

2007 in field hockey
2007
2007 in Malaysian sport
2007 in South Korean sport
2007 in Australian field hockey
2007 in Chinese sport
2007 in Canadian sports
2007 in Pakistani sport 
2007 in Indian sport 
2007 in Argentine sport